Tranquilino is a masculine given name. Notable people with the name include:

Tranquilino de Bonilla y Herdocia (1797–1864), Costa Rican politician
Tranquilino Garcete (1907–?), Paraguayan footballer
Tranquilino Luna (1849–1892), American politician
Tranquilino Berrios (1918-2007),
Puerto Rican procer 

Masculine given names